Siena College of Quezon City is a private, sectarian, non-stock basic and higher education institution run by the Congregation of the Dominican Sisters of St. Catherine of Siena in San Francisco del Monte, Quezon City, Philippines. It was established in 1959 by the Siena Sisters. The school offers tertiary education with degrees in Tourism, Business Administration, Hotel and Restaurant Management, Mass Communications and Religious Education. It also offers pre-school, elementary, secondary education, and SPED.

Siena College of Quezon City is a private, sectarian, nonstock basic and higher education institution run by the Congregation of the Dominican Sisters of St. Catherine of Siena in. San Francisco del Monte, Quezon City, Philippines. It was established in 1959 by the Siena Sisters. The school offers tertiary education with degrees in Tourism, Business Administration, Hotel and Restaurant Management, Mass Communications, and Religious Education. It also offers preschool, elementary, and secondary education, as well as Special Education and SPED.

History
True to its mission to “participate in the evangelizing mission of the Church by proclaiming Jesus Christ and building the Kingdom of God,” the Congregation of the Dominican Sisters of St. Catherine of Siena has zealously established schools throughout the country and abroad.  In the mid-1950s, the idea of setting up another school within the compound of the Motherhouse located in the then rugged fields of San Francisco del Monte was conceived.  It was in response to the education needs of the growing community in the area.  At that time, the entire place was in disarray, and it took the unfaltering courage and foresight of Rev. Natividad Pilapil, O.P., the Superior General of the Congregation, to start the construction of the first building along Del Monte Avenue in 1958.

At the start of the school year 1959–1960, Siena College opened its doors to 500 students who enrolled in the grade school, high school and college departments. The courses offered then in the college were Bachelor of Science in Arts, Commerce and Education, Secretarial and Home Arts.

In 1972, responding to the needs and demands of the time for a kind of service education that would address the problems of unemployment and school dropouts, Siena College phased out the traditional four-year courses and retained only the Secretarial and Special Home Arts courses.  In lieu of these, terminal courses were offered and the ladder-type curriculum was adopted.  These courses were Bachelor of Science in Business Administration, Secretarial Administration, Food Service Administration, Junior Secretarial Course, Food Technology, Practical Entrepreneurship, Hotel and Restaurant Management, General Clerical Course and Tourism.

At this time, the grade school adopted the Individualized Group-Guided Education (IGGE) program.

In 1974, fully aware of its responsibility to be an agent of change, Siena College adopted policies, measures and procedures to improve and upgrade the quality of its service.  To insure improvement, the school underwent two self-surveys:  one during the school year 1974-75 and the other during the school year 1976–77.  The Council on Education of the Congregation conducted these surveys.  As a result of these, a strong interest on the part of the administration and staff to apply for accreditation was aroused.  The Education Council of the institution unanimously approved of the plan.

The school year 1977-78 marked a more thorough and rigid operational self-survey using the PAASCU (Philippine Accrediting Association of Schools, Colleges and Universities) tools for evaluation.  The three departments of Siena College underwent the PAASCU preliminary surveys during the school year 1978–79.  The following year, the drive for improvement and development was carried on unhesitatingly and after a successful formal survey by the PAASCU, the grade school and the high school departments, as well as the college program of Bachelor of Science in Business Administration were granted accreditation for three years.

In 1980, the Congregation, through the General Chapter, approved the program of development for all its schools.  This program is the Catholic Schools-Systems Development (CS-SD).   A unique and highly systematized program, the CS-SD consists of different phases of continuing development for Catholic schools with emphasis on the formation of personnel into other Christ through a radical living of the Gospel and the improvement of education services through Christ-like operations.  Siena College entered the program immediately after its formation by the Congregation.  The program, as adopted, came to be known as OP-SSD (Order of Preachers-Schools Systems Development Program).  The congregational Council on Education facilitated its implementation.

In October 1982, the three departments of Siena College underwent the first Congregational Evaluation Visit (CEV), which is part of the CS-SD program.  It looked into how the school's instructional program and operations are in consonance with the congregational mission and charism.  In February of the same school year, 1982–83, the college and high school departments had their PAASCU re-accreditation visits, successfully passed it and were given an accredited status for five years.  The grade school had its re-accreditation visit last August 1983 and was also given a five-year accredited status.  The three departments were visited and surveyed again during the school year 1988-89 and were again granted accreditation for another five years.  The three departments again passed the resurvey visits during the school years 1994-95 and 2000-2001 successfully.

The following new programs were opened in 2003: the Caregiver course to enhance the development of skilled human resources in the health, social and other community development services and the Special Education program to provide conducive learning environment and facilities for special children.  In 2004, the Night High School program was opened to accommodate the needs of poor public elementary school graduates.  The school through its programs has shown deep commitment to the formation and development of a community of disciples who are “maka-Diyos, maka-tao, maka-bayan at maka-buhay.”  As a PAASCU member since 1980, Siena College, QC was granted again five-year re-accreditation status to the three departments in AY 2005–2006.

Academics

Graduate programs
Master of Arts in:
Religious Education
Pastoral Ministry

College
Bachelor in Secondary Education major in Religious Education
New majors:
English, Math, Biological science, Special education,
Bachelor of Science in Business Administration majors in:
Management Accounting (Non-Board)
Financial Management
Marketing Management
Human Resource Development
Bachelor of Science in Hotel & Restaurant Management (Ladderized)
Certificate in Commercial Cooking NC II
Certificate in Housekeeping NC II
Certificate in Food & Beverages NC II
Certificate in Bartending NC II
Certificate in Front Office NC II
Bachelor of Science in Tourism Management (Ladderized)
Certificate in Commercial Cooking NC II
Certificate in Travel Services NC II
Certificate in Tour Guiding Services NC II
Bachelor of Arts in Mass Communication

Integrated Basic Education Department (IBED)
High School
Grade 7 to Grade 10 (junior high school)
Grade 11 to Grade 12 (senior high school)
Grade School
Grades 1–6
Pre School
Kindergarten
Nursery
Special Education (SPED)

Other special programs
Beaterio High School Program 
Mother Francisca Skills Training Program

Admission
Generally, children enter Siena as nursery students. Students may try to be part of the student population as high school freshmen, by taking the Siena High School Entrance Examination (SEE). Transfer students are accepted with very high requirements.

The Siena Education has two elements: Personal Formation and Academic Formation.

Previously, High School was exclusive for girls until eventually becoming co-ed, accepting male students some time in the 2000s.

Notable alumni
Roberto (Bobby) Concepcion (Vlogger, Car Enthusiast, Known Quotes "Let's confuse non-Car Guys" and "People will tell you about me...")
Angelu de Leon (actress)
Amy Perez (actress)
Hilda Koronel (actress)
 Kimberly Diaz (actress)
Rio Locsin (actress)
Erich Gonzales (actress of ABS-CBN & Star Magic) Born: Erica Chryselle Gonzales Gancayco on  She is the youngest of four siblings from Davao City. 
Robin Padilla (actor) Born: Robinhood Fernando Carino Padilla on  Known as "Bad-Boy of the Philippine Movies" and currently a Senator, He is married to Mariel Rodriguez (as Mariel Rodriguez-Padilla).
 Senator Antonio Trillanes IV (senator, Siena GS 1983)
Dylan Ababou (basketball athlete)

See also
Siena College of Taytay, Rizal
Notre Dame-Siena College of Polomolok, South Cotabato

References

External links
Siena College of Quezon City Official website

Catholic universities and colleges in Metro Manila
Liberal arts colleges in the Philippines
Educational institutions established in 1959
Dominican educational institutions in the Philippines
Universities and colleges in Quezon City
1959 establishments in the Philippines